So Fresh: The Hits of Winter 2006 is part of the So Fresh album series. It was released in Australia on 10 June 2006.

Track listing
Rihanna – "SOS" (4:00)
Rogue Traders – "We're Coming Home" (3:22)
Ne-Yo – "So Sick" (3:27)
Chris Brown – "Yo (Excuse Me Miss)" (3:48)
Mariah Carey featuring Jermaine Dupri – "Get Your Number" (3:15)
Young Divas – "This Time I Know It's for Real" (3:39)
The Pussycat Dolls featuring will.i.am – "Beep" (3:48)
Sugababes – "Red Dress" (3:36)
Pink – "Stupid Girls" (3:12)
Westlife – "You Raise Me Up" (Chameleon Remix) (3:17)
Delta Goodrem – "Together We Are One" (4:14)
Ashlee Simpson – "L.O.V.E." (2:33)
Shannon Noll – "Now I Run" (3:43)
Nickelback – "Savin' Me" (3:37)
The Black Eyed Peas – "Pump It" (3:34)
Bernard Fanning – "Songbird" (2:35)
Pete Murray – "Opportunity" (3:37)
Christina Milian featuring Young Jeezy – "Say I" (3:32)
Lee Harding – "Anything for You" (3:02)
Kate DeAraugo – "Faded" (3:30)
Jamie Foxx – "Unpredictable" (3:15)
Deep Dish featuring Stevie Nicks – "Dreams" (3:48)

Charts

See also
 So Fresh
 2006 in music

References

External links
 Official site

So Fresh albums
2006 compilation albums
2006 in Australian music